Raffia palms (Raphia) are a genus of about twenty species of palms native to tropical regions of Africa, and especially Madagascar, with one species (R. taedigera) also occurring in Central and South America. R. taedigera is the source of raffia fibers, which are the veins of the leaves, and this species produces a fruit called "brazilia pods", "uxi nuts" or "uxi pods".

The plants are monocarpic, meaning that they flower once and then die after the seeds are mature. Some species have individual stems which die after fruiting, but have a root system which remains alive and sends up new stems which fruit.

Cultivation and uses

Fiber

Raffia fiber is produced from the membrane on the underside of the leaf fronds. The membrane is taken off to create a long thin fiber, which can be rolled together for added strength before they are finally dried. Fibres can be made into twine, rope, garden ties, and used in tree grafting. Fibres are important in the area of textiles, as they can be dyed and woven into products such as decorative mats, baskets, placemats, hats, and shoes.

Raffia wine
The sap of the palm can be fermented into raffia wine. It is traditionally collected by cutting a box in the top of the palm and suspending a large gourd to collect the milky white liquid.  Unlike oil palms, this process kills the tree. Sap from both the raffia and oil palms can be allowed to ferment over a few days. When first collected from the tree, it is sweet and appears slightly carbonated. As it ages more sugar is converted. Raffia wine tends to be sweeter at any age when compared to oil palm wine. Both kinds of palm wine can also be distilled into strong liquors, such as Ogogoro. Traditionally in some cultures where raffia or oil palm are locally available, guests and spirits are offered these drinks from the palm trees.

Other uses
In local construction, raffia fibres are used for ropes, with branches and leaves providing sticks and supporting beams, and various roof coverings. The people of Ogba kingdom in Rivers State and other southern Nigerians use raffia palm fronds as fishing poles. The frond is usually cut from a young palm tree. The leaves are removed and the stake is dried, which becomes very light, and the hook is attached to a line, which is tied to the stake, making it a fishing pole.

The raffia palm is important in societies such as that of the Province of Bohol in the Philippines, Kuba of Democratic Republic of the Congo, Nso of Cameroon, the Igbo and Ibibio/Annang/Bahumono of Southeastern Nigeria, the Tiv of Northcentral Nigeria and Southwestern Cameroons, the Urhobo and Ijaw people of the Niger delta Nigeria and the Yoruba people of southwestern Nigeria, among several other West African ethnic nations.

Synthetic raffia
A strand of raffia has a maximum length of about 1.5 m and an irregular width. When found on spools or hanks of greater lengths, it is likely synthetic raffia, produced from polypropylene. First produced by Covema in collaboration with Sulzer, a manufacturer of flat weaving looms for natural fibers, who adapted their looms to process synthetic raffia. These fabrics are used to make carpet backing, protective sheets, and bags for rice, potatoes, and citrus fruit. Covema also developed a method to cover raffia fabric with a thin film of polyethylene in order to make it waterproof.

Species

References

External links
 Kew palms checklist: Raphia
 Sorting Raphia names
 PACSOA: Raphia
 South Africa plants: Raphia australis
 Fairchild Tropical Botanic Garden: Raphia
 Raphia articles at Palm Pedia

 
Decorative fruits and seeds
Flora of Africa